Membrane structures are spatial structures made out of tensioned membranes. The structural use of membranes can be divided into pneumatic structures, tensile membrane structures, and cable domes. In these three kinds of structure, membranes work together with cables, columns and other construction members to find a form. 

Membranes are also used as non-structural cladding, as at the Beijing National Stadium where the spaces between the massive steel structural members are infilled with PTFE coated glass fiber fabric and ETFE foil. The other major building on the site, built for the 2008 Summer Olympics, is the Beijing National Aquatics Center, also known as the Water Cube. It is entirely clad in 100,000 square metres of inflated ETFE foil cushions arranged as an apparently random cellular structure.

Materials

The common membranes used in membrane structures include:
 PVC coated polyester fabric
 Translucent Polyethylene fabric
 PVC coated glass fiber fabric
 PTFE coated glass fiber fabric; foils like 
 ETFE foil
 PVC foil.

Gallery

Conference 
The International Centre for Numerical Methods in Engineering (CIMNE) in Barcelona biannually holds the international conference Textile Composites and Inflatable Structures (Structural Membranes). 
The conference has been taking place in Barcelona, Stuttgart and Munich. The tenth edition of the conference will be organized in 2021 in Munich.

Literature 
ETFE, Technology and Design, Annette LeCuyer, Verlag Birkhäuser, 
Membrane Structures, Hrsg. Klaus-Michael Koch, Verlag Prestel,

See also
 Tensile structure
 Tension fabric building
 Fabric structure
 Air-supported structure

References 

Architecture
 
Roofs